Missouri Headwaters State Park is a public recreation area occupying  at the site of the official start of the Missouri River. The park offers camping, hiking trails, hunting, and water-related activities. The park includes the Three Forks of the Missouri National Historic Landmark, designated in 1960 because the site is one where the Lewis and Clark Expedition camped in 1805.

Setting
The bulk of Missouri Headwaters State Park is found on a peninsula flanked on the east by the Gallatin River and the west by the Missouri River and the Madison River. Small parts of the park are also located on the east bank of the Gallatin River, and an island in the Missouri just below the confluence of the Madison and Jefferson Rivers. The Jefferson River meets the Madison and Missouri roughly midway through the park's north-south extent.

History
The Lewis and Clark Expedition encamped at the confluence site on July 26, 1805.  On July 28, Meriwether Lewis wrote in his journal:

The expedition were likely the first white men to ever penetrate this landscape.  Lewis and Clark were at first uncertain how to proceed, and scouted each of the branches before ultimately departing on July 30 up the Jefferson River.  The expedition also passed the forks on its return journey on July 13, 1806.

As the west was explored and developed through the 19th century, the forks area was frequently used as a camp site by fur trappers.  Acquisition for the state park was begun by preservation organizations in the 1960s.

Claims of Missouri River source
The Lewis and Clark decision not to call the Jefferson the Missouri has spurred debate over what is the longest river in North America, since the Missouri and Mississippi are nearly identical in length. The Missouri traditionally had been called the longest river in North America.  However, 72 miles of it have been trimmed off in re-channeling its streambedmainly for the many hydroelectric power plants in the region so that it is now sometimes referred as second to the Mississippi in terms of length.  If the Jefferson were included in the Missouri length, it would technically still be considered the longest river by experts of the United States Geological Survey.

The utmost headwaters of the Missouri are subject to debate but two commonly claimed locations ultimately drain into the Jefferson.  Lewis on August 12, 1805 said he visited the headwaters on Trail Creek just above Lemhi Pass on the Continental Divide in the Beaverhead Mountains at around 8,600 feet which he described:

the most distant fountain of the waters of the mighty Missouri in surch(sic) of which we have spent so many toilsome days and wristless(sic) nights.

In 1888 Jacob V. Brower, who had championed turning the headwaters of the Mississippi River into a Minnesota state park, visited another site which today is also claimed to be the furthest point on the Missouri.  Brower published his finding in 1896 in "The Missouri: Its Utmost Source."

Brower's Spring, as the site is now known, is at around 8,800 feet in the Centennial Mountains.  The site is commemorated by a rock pile at the source of Hellroaring Creek which flows into Red Rock River and then into Clark Canyon Reservoir where it joins the Beaverhead then the Big Hole River before ultimately hooking up with the Jefferson.

See also
List of National Historic Landmarks in Montana
National Register of Historic Places listings in Gallatin County, Montana

References

External links

Missouri Headwaters State Park Montana Fish, Wildlife & Parks
Missouri Headwaters State Park Map Montana Fish, Wildlife & Parks

State parks of Montana
Provincial and state parks in the Rocky Mountains
Missouri River
Protected areas of Gallatin County, Montana
Protected areas established in 1947
1947 establishments in Montana
Lewis and Clark Expedition
History of the Rocky Mountains
National Historic Landmarks in Montana
National Register of Historic Places in Gallatin County, Montana